Thomas, Tom or Tommy Ross may refer to:

Politicians
Thomas Edwin Ross (1873–1951), member of the Canadian House of Commons
Thomas Hambly Ross (1886–1956), Canadian politician
Thomas R. Ross (1788–1869), U.S. Representative from Ohio
Thomas Ross (minister) (1614–1679), Scottish minister
Thomas Ross (Pennsylvania politician) (1806–1865), U.S. Representative from Pennsylvania
Tom Ross (politician) (born 1981), British Labour politician

Sports
 Thomas Ross (speed skater) (born 1927), British Olympic speed skater
 Tom Ross (cricketer) (1872–1947), Irish cricketer
 Tom Ross (ice hockey defenseman), ice hockey defenseman
 Tom Ross (ice hockey, born 1954) (born 1954), former professional ice hockey player
 Tom Ross (rugby union) (born 1998), Australian rugby union player
 Tommy Ross (footballer) (1946–2017), Scottish professional footballer

Others
Thomas E. Ross (born 1942), professor at the University of North Carolina at Pembroke
Thomas W. Ross (born 1950), president of the University of North Carolina system
Thomas Ross (architect) (1839–1930), Scottish architect, best known for surveys of Scotland's architectural heritage
T. Paterson Ross (Thomas Paterson Ross, died 1957), architect in the San Francisco Bay Area
Tom Ross (producer) (born 1947), Scottish journalist and television producer
Tom Ross, radio sport broadcaster on Gold and BRMB
Tommy Ross, fictional character from the horror novel Carrie by Stephen King

See also